Miles & Coltrane is a live album by American jazz musician Miles Davis, released in 1988 by Columbia Records. The music was recorded at two different shows—one on July 4, 1958, at the Newport Jazz Festival, and one from October 27, 1955, in New York. The tracks have been digitally remastered directly from the original analog tapes.

Track listing 
"Ah-Leu-Cha" (Parker) – 5:49
"Straight, No Chaser" (Monk) – 8:48
"Fran-Dance" (Davis) – 7:12
"Two Bass Hit" (Gillespie, Lewis) – 4:09
"Bye Bye Blackbird" (Dixon, Henderson) – 9:16
"Little Melonae" (McLean) – 7:20
"Budo" (Davis, Powell) – 4:16

Personnel

Newport, 1958 (tracks 1-5)
Miles Davis – trumpet
John Coltrane – tenor saxophone
Cannonball Adderley – alto saxophone
Bill Evans – piano
Paul Chambers – bass
Jimmy Cobb – drums

New York, 1955 (tracks 6, 7)
Miles Davis – trumpet
John Coltrane – tenor saxophone
Red Garland – piano
Paul Chambers – bass
Philly Joe Jones – drums
George Avakian – producer
Michael Berniker – coordinator
Nathaniel Brewster – research

Production
Tim Geelan – mixer
Amy Herot – coordinator
Teo Macero – producer
Jeff Rosen – liner notes
Allen Weinberg – album cover

References

External links

1958 live albums
Albums produced by George Avakian
Albums produced by Teo Macero
Miles Davis live albums
Columbia Records live albums
John Coltrane live albums
Live hard bop albums
Albums recorded at the Newport Jazz Festival